Ta Laïka Tis Despinas is the fourth compilation album by Greek singer Despina Vandi, featuring a collection of songs of the laïka genre during her time at the Minos EMI label. The album was included as the third disc of the box set Despina Vandi in 2005.

Track listing

Release history

Credits and personnel

Personnel
T. Apostolidis - music
Panos Falaras - lyrics
Thanasis Kargidis - music
Vasilis Karras - music, lyrics
L. Komninos - lyrics
Tony Kontaxakis - music, lyrics
Christoforos Mpalampanidis - lyrics
Christos Nikolopoulos - music
Phoebus - music, lyrics
Despina Vandi - vocals

Production
Panos Bothos - transfer

Design
Evi Efthimiou - artwork
Takis Spiropoulos - photos

Credits adapted from the album's liner notes.

References

External links
 Official site

2005 compilation albums
Albums produced by Phoebus (songwriter)
Despina Vandi compilation albums
Greek-language albums
Minos EMI compilation albums